The Improved Benevolent Protective Order of Elks of the World (IBPOEW) is an African-American fraternal order modeled on the Benevolent and Protective Order of Elks. It was established in 1897 in the United States. In the  early 21st century, it has 500,000 members and 1500 lodges in the world.

History 

The Order claims descent from the Free African Society, the first formal black society in America, founded in 1787 in Philadelphia, Pennsylvania as a mutual aid society by Absalom Jones and Richard Allen. That organization later resulted in the founding of the first African-American congregation in the Episcopal Church, headed by Jones, and the founding of the African Methodist Episcopal Church, the first independent black denomination, by Allen.

The formation of the Improved BPOE as a separate order, however, began in February 1897, when it was established in Cincinnati, Ohio, by city residents B. F. Howard and Arthur J. Riggs. The latter was a Pullman porter who had been born into slavery. The men had met in another fraternal association and wanted to establish a chapter of Elks; the white organization refused them admission. (Note: In 1972 the white-majority BPOE opened admission to African Americans and other minorities.) Riggs had gained a copy of the BPOE ritual and received the first copyright for it, establishing their organization in September 1898. The first meeting of the new IBPOEW organization was held on Thursday, November 17, 1898. This was a period of a rise in black fraternal associations, with men organizing to work in community and create strong networks.

The BPOE disputed the African Americans' use of the ritual, but they held the copyright. In 1912 the Improved, Benevolent Protective Order of Elks of the World was sued by the Benevolent and Protective Order of Elks in the State of New York to keep them from using the "Elks" name. The New York Court of Appeals ruled in favor of the BPOE, with Judge Barlett stating, "If the members desired the name of an animal there is a long list of beasts, birds, fishes which have not yet been appropriated for such a purpose." The decision was apparently ignored after the IBPOEW made a minor change in the letters on their seal.

The IBPOEW founded a Civil Liberties department in 1926. It was active in opposing the segregation of schools in Gary, Indiana, the next year. The number of blacks in the city had increased markedly during the Great Migration, as men were attracted from the rural South to the city's industrial jobs. At the same time, there were also numerous European immigrants settling in the city.

During the 1930s and 1940s, the IBPOEW was active in the effort of blacks to "gain work while resisting union exclusion, workplace segregation, and unemployment."  According to historian Venus Green, the Improved Elks labor activism was distinguished from other black fraternal organizations by their "cross-class alliances, male/female solidarity, racial unity, a willingness to join coalitions across ideologies and to engage in multiple forms of struggle, especially militant mass mobilization". In the IBPOEW, ideologies ranged from Christianity to communism, but the members worked together to achieve labor goals.

From 1950 to 1966, the IBPOEW owned and operated as their National Shrine "The John Brown Farm" (also known as "The Kennedy Farm") in southern Washington County, Maryland. That property was the site where John Brown had trained his troops in anticipation of his raid on Harpers Ferry in 1859; this was a catalyst for the Civil war and the abolition of slavery. The Elks purchased the property as a memorial to Brown and built several buildings on the 235-acre property, including a 50' by 124' auditorium that was used as a meeting place for Elks gatherings of up to three thousand persons on Fourth of July and Labor Day weekends. The auditorium was rented on summer weekends by a local black entrepreneur, John Bishop, who booked into that venue dozens of the biggest stars of rhythm and blues, including Ray Charles, Aretha Franklin, James Brown, Marvin Gaye, Little Richard, Chuck Berry, B. B. King, Eartha Kitt, Otis Redding, Etta James, the Coasters, and the Drifters.

The order's historical importance as a place of activism continues to be a central aspect of its public image, that has even reached the interest of scholars and historians.

Organization 
The organization and titles of the Improved Elks are reportedly modeled on that of the BPOE. Its Grand Lodge meets annually, and the organization is headquartered in Winton, North Carolina. The Improved Elks have an officially recognized female auxiliary, the Daughters of the Improved Benevolent Protective Order of Elks of the World. They were organized by Emma Virginia Kelly on June 13, 1902, in Norfolk, Virginia.

In 1923 the IBPOEW convention in Chicago was attended by 3,000 delegates. At that meeting J. Finley Wilson was re-elected "Grand Exalted Leader'.

Membership 
In 1979 the Improved Elks had approximately 450,000 members. In the early 21st century, they have 500,000 members in 1500 lodges around the world. Like other fraternal associations in the United States, both black and white, the Improved Elks have been dealing with declining membership as older members die. Younger people face a different world, and seem less inclined to join such associations, sometimes preferring explicitly political or professional associations related to work.

Ritual 
Just like the BPOE, the Improved Elks have kept much of their original ritual intact.

Benefits and philanthropy 
The Improved Elks in the United States sponsor scholarship programs, youth summer computer literacy camps, help for children with special needs, and extensive community service activities.

Selected US lodges

Arkansas
 William Townsend Lodge No. 1149 of Pine Bluff

California
 Clementine Lodge No. 598 of San Diego

Colorado
Pikes Peak Region Lodge #473 of Colorado Springs, CO

Connecticut
 Shining Star Lodge of Stamford
 Goodwill Lodge No. 1325 Waterbury
 New Nutmeg charter Oak #67 [Hartford, Connecticut|Hartford]
 Pride Of Connecticut [New Britain, Connecticut|Hartford]
 Carter L Marshall [Danbury, Connecticut|Danbury]

Delaware
 Paul Laurence Dunbar Lodge No. 106 of Wilmington

District of Columbia
 Columbia Lodge No. 85 of Washington, D.C.

Kansas
 Peerless Princess Lodge No. 243 of Wichita
 Midwest Lodge No. 1444 of Topeka

Massachusetts
 Commonwealth Lodge No. 19 of Boston
 Quinsigamond Lodge No. 173 of Worcester, Massachusetts
 Harmony Lodge No. 140 of Springfield
 Obie Knox Lodge 1568 Holyoke

Michigan
James L. Crawford Lodge No. 322 of Ann Arbor

New Jersey
 Sunlight Elks Lodge of Trenton, New Jersey
 Monmouth Lodge No. 122 of Asbury Park, New Jersey

New York
 Imperial Lodge No. 127 of New York City
 Brooklyn Lodge No. 32
 Neptune Lodge No. 743 of New York City
 Industry Lodge No. 889 of New York City
 Syracuse Lodge No. 1104 of Syracuse

Ohio

 Alpha Lodge No. 1 of Cincinnati, Ohio
 Waldorf Lodge No. 76 of Dayton, Ohio
 Harvey H. Alston Sr Lodge No. 1755 Columbus, Ohio
 Spirit of Ohio Lodge No.52 Cleveland, Ohio
 Glenville Elks Lodge # 1494 ( Cleveland, Ohio)
 Prosperity Lodge No.1971 of Columbus, Ohio

Pennsylvania

Philadelphia
 
 Christopher Perry Lodge No. 965 of Philadelphia
 Leonard C. Irvin Lodge No. 994 Philadelphia
 Edward W. Henry Lodge No. 1235 of Philadelphia
 O.V. Catto Lodge No. 20 of Philadelphia

Rest of state
 John A. Watts Lodge No. 224 of Chester
 B.F. Howard Lodge No. 580 of Media
 John F. Moreland Lodge No. 801 of Monaca
 Maple View Lodge No. 780 of Elizabeth
 North Side Lodge No. 124 of Pittsburgh
 Lawrence Lodge #18 of New Castle
 Berks Lodge No. 47 Reading
 Unity Lodge No. 71 of Harrisburg
 Conestoga Lodge No. 140 of Lancaster
 Capt. Levi M. Hood Lodge No. 159 of West Chester
 Cyrene Lodge No. 169 of Steelton
 Arandale Lodge No. 184 of Altoona
 Canon Lodge No. 186 of Canonsburg
 Twin City Lodge No. 187 of Farrell
 Clinton J. Lewis Lodge No. 201 of Bristol
 Edgar A. Still Lodge No. 207 of Williamsport
 Booker T. Washington Lodge No. 218 of McKeesport
 Brighton Pioneer Lodge No. 219 of Beaver Falls
 Valley Lodge No. 294 of New Kensington
 Gem City Lodge No. 328 of Erie
 Flood City Lodge No. 371 of Johnstown
 Elmwood Lodge No. 438 of Norristown
 Monroe Lodge No. 513 of Stroudsburg
 Okay Lodge No. 697 of Monessen
 William E. Burrell Lodge No. 737 of North Hills
 Twin County Lodge No. 838 of Vandergrift
 Montgomery Lodge No. 1271 of Pottstown
 Bethal Lodge No. 1284 Bethlehem

See also 
Prince Hall Freemasonry
Grand United Order of Odd Fellows
List of African-American Greek and fraternal organizations

References

Further reading
 Green, Venus, “Not Your Average Fraternal Organization: The IBPOEW and Labor Activism, 1935–1950,” Labor History, 53 (Nov. 2012), 471–94.

External links 
 

African-American organizations
Benevolent and Protective Order of Elks
Ethnic fraternal orders in the United States
Men's organizations in the United States
Organizations established in 1897